Anatoli Zinovyevich Kartayev (born April 12, 1947) is a former Russian and Soviet professional ice hockey player and coach.

Biography 
Pupil of the Chelyabinsk sports club "Voskhod" (first trainer S. Sayfutdinov). In "Traktor" played in 1971-78 position of the forward.

In 1969 Kartayevr graduated from sports faculty of the Chelyabinsk Teacher Training College, in 1982 — the Higher school of trainers on hockey.

Bronze prize-winner of the USSR championship of 1977, finalist of the Cup of the USSR of 1973. In team Kartayev won back 16 seasons, hammered 214 washers.

Kartayev was attracted in the second national team of the USSR for which played more than 20 matches, hammered 15 washers.

Kartayev trained hockey teams the "Metallurgist" (Chelyabinsk) (1984–87), "Motorist" (Karagandy) (1989 — 1991), "Traktor" (Chelyabinsk), worked in China and Yugoslavia.

From 1996 to 2002 Kartayev headed Federation of hockey of Chelyabinsk Oblast.

Kartayev was the head coach of hockey club "Kazakhmys" (Satbayev, Kazakhstan) (October 2003-December 1, 2007).
Together with "Kazakhmys" became the champion of Kazakhstan in a season 2005/06. In 2007 worked as the head coach of the national team of Kazakhstan.

Now Kartayev works as the trainer in Kopeysk.

It is awarded by a medal "For valorous work. In commemoration of the 100 anniversary since the birth of V. I. Lenin".

Kartayev am married. Two sons: Dmitry (grandson hockey player Vladislav) and Pavel (radio host NASHE - radio).

References 

1947 births
Living people
Kazakhstan men's national ice hockey team coaches
Russian ice hockey coaches
Soviet ice hockey coaches
Soviet ice hockey forwards
Sportspeople from Chelyabinsk
Traktor Chelyabinsk players